Charlotte Maria Offlow Johnson Wahl (née Fawcett; 29 May 1942 – 13 September 2021) was a British artist. She was the mother of politician Boris Johnson, as well as the journalist Rachel Johnson and the politician Jo Johnson.

Early life and education
Born Charlotte Offlow Fawcett in Oxford, Charlotte Johnson Wahl was the daughter of Frances (née Lowe) and James Fawcett. She was the granddaughter of Americans Elias Avery Lowe, a palaeographer of Lithuanian Jewish descent, and Helen Tracy Lowe-Porter, a translator. She read English at Oxford University, and was the first married female undergraduate at Lady Margaret Hall. She interrupted her studies to visit the United States with her husband Stanley Johnson whom she met at Oxford and married in Marylebone, London, in 1963. She later returned and was awarded a second-class honours degree.

Paintings
Johnson Wahl was recorded as having "made her name as a professional portrait painter" for Crispin Tickell, Joanna Lumley, Jilly Cooper, Simon Jenkins, and others, but she also painted landscapes which have been described as echoing the Vorticist style.

Her shows at the Maudsley Hospital in London in 1974, in Brussels in 1970s, and at the Gavin Graham Gallery in London in 2004 were sold out. A retrospective exhibition of her work at Mall Galleries in London in 2015 was also successful.

Her paintings sold for £1,000 to £5,000. Two of Wahl's paintings are in the collection of the Bethlem Museum of the Mind; another two are in the collections of Oxford University colleges.

Personal life
Johnson Wahl was the mother of former Prime Minister Boris Johnson, former MP Jo Johnson (now Baron Johnson of Marylebone), journalist Rachel Johnson, and entrepreneur Leo Johnson. She and Stanley Johnson divorced in 1979. Johnson Wahl then married American professor Nicholas Wahl in 1988, but was widowed in 1996. She was diagnosed with Parkinson's disease at the age of 40.

In 2015, the Evening Standard referred to Johnson Wahl as "left-wing", with her daughter Rachel stating that her father Stanley "tends to marry socialists." Rachel noted that her mother was "the only red in the village when we lived on Exmoor".

Biographer Tom Bower recorded an interview with Johnson Wahl where she said that Stanley Johnson 'hit me many times, over many years'. On one occasion in the 1970s he allegedly broke her nose, with Johnson Wahl stating: "He broke my nose. He made me feel like I deserved it. I want the truth to be told."

During Boris Johnson's speech to the Conservative Party conference in October 2019, he said that his mother voted for the United Kingdom to leave the European Union in the 2016 referendum.

Johnson Wahl died at St Mary's Hospital in London on 13 September 2021, at the age of 79.

References

External links
 Charlotte Johnson Wahl—Home of Johnson Wahl's 2015 exhibition
 Mall Galleries: Charlotte Johnson Wahl—Mall Galleries on Johnson Wahl

1942 births
2021 deaths
20th-century English painters
20th-century English women artists
21st-century English painters
21st-century English women artists
Alumni of Lady Margaret Hall, Oxford
Artists from Oxford
English people of Lithuanian-Jewish descent
English people of Russian-Jewish descent
English portrait painters
English women painters
Parents of prime ministers of the United Kingdom
People with Parkinson's disease
Boris Johnson family